Rhon psions, also known as Ruby psions are a fictional group of extremely powerful psionics in the Saga of the Skolian Empire by Catherine Asaro.

Psions in the Saga of the Skolian Empire 
Psion is a term describing people with empathic and in some cases telepathic abilities. Psions can detect emotions, and even individual thoughts, depending on the strength of the psion and the proximity of those around them. They are also susceptible to the emotional suffering of people who are near them, and can suffer emotional scars from other psions who project their pain naturally. To survive the ongoing emotional attacks, psions are trained to put up barriers around their minds, both to protect themselves from unwelcomed feelings and thoughts and to prevent projecting onto others.

Origin of psion capability 
There are several hundred genes that result in psionic abilities. The more such genes a psion possesses, the stronger psionic abilities he/she manifests. However, many of these genes are closely linked to recessives that may lead to severe abnormalities and deformities in any children produced. As a result, the stronger the psion parent, the more likely it is that a child will be either deformed or most often never born, the fetus dying in the early stages of pregnancy. This is why psions are very rare. Their genes are recessive, and survive genetically by producing strong pheromones that draw psions together.

Telepathy and empathy in Asaro's novels are mediated by two microscopic brain structures, the Kyle Afferent Body (KAB) and Kyle Efferent Body (KEB). The KEB works by modulating the wave functions of some of the particles within it in a way that models, on a much smaller scale and with a low degree of precision, the electrochemical patterns (i.e. thoughts and emotions) of the brain surrounding it. The KAB detects such signals from the KEBs of other nearby psions via quantum entanglement, establishing matching patterns. "Parastructures" surrounding the KEB and KAB feed information about a sender's brain activity into the KEB, and interpret the quantum patterns in the KAB back into emotions and thoughts in the receiver.

KAB Rating 
The term KAB Rating stands for Kyle Afferent Body Rating, and is also called "Kyle Rating". It refers to the strength of a psion's empathic and telepathic abilities and is measured on a scale from 0 to 10, based on a logarithmic inverse of how many people it would take to find an individual with a given mental strength. Most humans rate between 0 and 2 on this scale, which denotes absent or marginal empathic and telepathic abilities. A three or higher indicates an empath; a six denotes a telepath.

There is also a group of psions who have a rating too high to be measured numerically. Those are called "Rhon". They are extremely rare and to be born Rhon a child must get the full set of psion genes from both parents. In practice, the term Rhon refers to members of Ruby Dynasty, the ruling family of Skolian Empire, as Rhon not related to them are not known.

The Rhon project 
The Rhon project was instigated to genetically engineer extremely powerful psions. The project was led by the prominent geneticist Hezahr Rhon. The initial project of Dr. Rhon was actually undertaken to prevent the suffering of psions by attempting to modify their brains so they wouldn't receive the pain of others. The attempt took a nightmarish turn for worse, spawning a race of human beings whose Kyle organs are hardwired to interpret pain signals from normal telepaths as orgasmic pleasure called "transcendence". When he realized what his creations were, Dr. Rhon wanted to destroy them, but they murdered him first and destroyed his work.

As a result, there arose a race of people known as Aristos whose members are the ultimate anti-empaths, sadists utterly devoid of compassion save for a very few characters (Corbal Xir, Calliope Muze, and Tarquine Iquar) who have undergone surgery to remove their ability for transcendence. The Aristo nature is characterized not only by their cruelty but also by power-hunger and sense of superiority. Their leader Eube Qox, founded the Eubian Concord and his descendants presently rule it.

Due to their need for transcendence, Aristos started to breed psions, using them as pleasure slaves, so called providers. Their main goal was to produce an extremely strong psion, who could serve them as an ultimate provider, because the stronger a provider's psionic abilities, the stronger pain signals he produces while tortured and the greater pleasure an Aristo experiences.

The first actual Rhon psions were a pair of siblings meant to be bred to each other to found a pre-eminent line of providers. They were created from genetic samples of long dead members of the once so powerful Ruby Empire's ruling caste, who were known for their great empathic and telepathic abilities. The male half of the pair, name unknown, committed suicide upon realizing his intended purpose. The female, Lahaylia Selei, killed her captors and escaped.

Lahaylia then founded the Skolian Imperialate. Later she discovered a natural Rhon from a nearly dead race of Ruby colonists, named Jarac Skolia, and took him as her consort.

However, since this history is rather unnoble, the story as told in the Skolian Empire omits the involvement of the Aristos in creating the Rhon psions.

Kyle Web 
The Kyle Web, also known as the psiberweb, is an instantaneous interstellar communication network powered by Locks.

The psiberweb can be thought of as similar to the Internet. Unlike the Internet, the psiberweb, rather than existing in real physical form, transmits information through "Kyle space", also known as "psiberspace". A theoretical physicist by training, Asaro uses the concepts of the Hilbert space described by the harmonics to create the universe called Kyle space. Spherical harmonics (see also Spherical Harmonic) are an orthonormal set of eigenfunctions used in many areas of math and  physics, including quantum mechanics and electromagnetics. By directly applying the rules that define Hilbert spaces described by the angular wave functions that solve the Laplace Equation, the author invents a universe where "location" is based on quantum wave functions rather than position and time, and where a psion's thoughts determined their location in Kyle space.

Lock 
The Locks are three powerful sentient machines created by the ancient Ruby Empire. They are located at points of disruption in normal spacetime caused by an intersection with Kyle space, which manifests as a great column of light called a "Kyle singularity". The ancient technology which created the Locks has been lost, but the Skolian Empire has deduced some of its functioning. Their three known remaining Locks are located on the Orbiter space habitat (headquarters of the Skolian military), the planet Raylicon (origin of the Ruby Empire), and on the Onyx platform.
  
The psiberweb is crucial to the defence of the Skolian Empire. Access and control of the psiberweb is what gives the Skolian Empire its equal strength to the more powerful and more numerous Trader empire. Only the Rhon psions have sufficient Kyle Rating to interface with the Locks. In exceptional cases Rhon can even receive emotions over big distances (even through space), mostly when they are closely related to the sender. Less powerful psions called telops can also access and use the Kyle Web, but cannot construct or maintain it. It is possible for a Rhon psion to physically enter psiberspace via a Lock, as the Ruby Pharaoh Dyhianna Selei and her son Taquinil did to escape a Eubian attack on the Orbiter. Inexperienced psions suffer potentially fatal headaches upon entering a Lock.  Dyhianna eventually emerged from psiberspace on a random planet, but Taquinil's whereabouts remain unknown at the time of the novel Catch the Lightning.

Triad 
Rhon psions can act as Keys to the psiberweb, engaging the Locks to create and maintain psiberweb links. The Locks can support only a limited number of Keys. This limit is determined by a psiberspace law equivalent to the Pauli Exclusion Principle, in that no more than one personality of a specific type can be joined to the Locks at any given time. If two persons of the same type were to join the psiberweb simultaneously, one is likely to die, as Kurj did to Jarac.

Rhon psions that "join" the Locks are considered members of the Dyad or Triad, depending on the context of the novel in the series. A Dyad is formed by two complementary personalities, and a Triad is formed by three such. The Dyad or the Triad when acting together forms the full executive authority that governs the Skolian Empire together with an elected parliament, the Assembly.

The different Keys that can exist, (depending which time period the particular novel occurs in), are the Assembly Key, the Military Key, and the Web Key. Each of these Keys has a line succession that is hereditary, though all the members of the Skolia family are in each of the lines at various points due to issues of consanguinity.

 Assembly Key

The personality powering the Assembly Key is required to have a peerless intellect and a piercing analytical mind. Therefore, the person who is the Assembly Key takes the sobriquet of the "Mind of Skolia", or the style of Ruby Pharaoh, with at least the executive powers of chief-of-state. The Selei branch of the Rhon produces the Assembly Key with following line of succession: Lahaylia, then Dyhianna, with Taquinil the designated successor.

 Military Key

The personality powering the Military Key is required to be robust, ruthless, agile, forceful, and uncompromising. Therefore, the person who is the Military Key takes the sobriquet of the "Fist of Skolia", or the style of Imperator, with the executive power of commander-in-chief of all armed forces in the Imperialate. The Skolia branch of the Rhon produces the Military Key: Jarac, Kurj, Althor Valdoria Skolia, Sauscony Valdoria Skolia, and Kelric Valdoria Skolia.

 Web Key

The personality powering the Web Key is not required to have any great intellectual or organization skill, merely large amounts of willpower and emotional strength. The person who is the Web Key takes the sobriquet of the "Heart of Skolia". The only one so far who has ever been the Web Key was Eldrinson Althor Valdoria. Eldrinson perceives psiberspace as a sea.

References 

Saga of the Skolian Empire